A tantrum is an emotional outburst, usually associated with those in emotional distress.

Tantrum may also refer to:

Film, TV and comics
 Tantrum, a graphic novel by Jules Feiffer
 Tantrum (Transformers), a character from the Transformers toy line
 Tantrum, the fictional energy drink from How I Met Your Mother episode "Duel Citizenship"
 Tantrum Entertainment
 Tantrum, a Static Shock character
 Tantrums, an alternative name for the film People Toys

Music
 Tantrum (Sri Lankan band), a Sri Lankan heavy metal band
 Tantrum (American band), a 1970s rock band
 Tantrum (album), Tantrum's 1978 debut album
 Fitz and the Tantrums
 Thomas Tantrum
 Thomas Tantrum (album)
 Tangos and Tantrums, an album by Sylvie Lewis
 Bundle of Tantrums, an album by Jasmine Thompson

Other
Tantrum (roller coaster), a roller coaster at Six Flags Darien Lake, New York